Kengtung Airport is an airport in Kengtung, Shan State, Myanmar .

Airlines and destinations

References

Kengtung
Airports in Myanmar